Rathnayaka Mudiyanselage Ranjith Madduma Bandara (born 25 August 1954) (known as Ranjith Madduma Bandara)  is a Sri Lankan politician and a member of the Parliament of Sri Lanka. He was appointed as the  cabinet Minister of Law and Order and Minister of Public Administration and Management by the President, Maithripala Sirisena on 8 March 2018. He has also acted as the Minister of Transport.

His father R. M. Gunasekera, former member of the parliament for Bibile was assassinated when he was seven years old. His uncle was Dharmadasa Banda. He was educated at Ananda College and became a planter and a businessman.

He is a long time member of Sri Lanka's main political party United National Party, and had held many positions in the party. On February 11, 2020 he was appointed as the General Secretary of Samagi Jana Balawegaya.

References

External links
Sri Lanka Parliament profile

Living people
Members of the 9th Parliament of Sri Lanka
Members of the 10th Parliament of Sri Lanka
Members of the 11th Parliament of Sri Lanka
Members of the 12th Parliament of Sri Lanka
Members of the 13th Parliament of Sri Lanka
Members of the 14th Parliament of Sri Lanka
Members of the 15th Parliament of Sri Lanka
Members of the 16th Parliament of Sri Lanka
Samagi Jana Balawegaya politicians
United National Party politicians
1954 births
Cabinet ministers of Sri Lanka
Sri Lankan planters